John Williams Rose (born February 23, 1965) is an American politician and businessman serving as the U.S. representative for Tennessee's 6th congressional district since 2019. A Republican, he was commissioner of agriculture for Tennessee and president of Boson Software, LLC.

Early life and education 
Rose was born and raised in Cookeville, Tennessee, and earned a Bachelor of Science in agribusiness economics from Tennessee Technological University in 1988, a Master of Science in agricultural economics from Purdue University in 1990, and a J.D. from Vanderbilt University Law School.

Career 
In 1992, Rose co-founded Transcender Corp., a provider of online information technology certification products that was sold in October 2000 for $60 million. Rose owns and is the president of Boson Software, LLC, which trains IT professionals.

Rose served as commissioner of agriculture for Tennessee in 2002. He owns a family farm in rural Temperance Hall, west of Cookeville.

U.S. House of Representatives

Elections

2018

On August 2, 2018, Rose won the Republican primary for the 6th Congressional District after Diane Black vacated the seat to run for governor. He defeated Dawn Barlow in the November 6 general election with more than 70% of the vote. After being elected, Rose hired former Representative Van Hilleary as his chief of staff.

2020

Rose won a second term with 73.7% of the vote, defeating Democratic nominee Christopher Finley. He was unopposed in the primary election.

Notable acts in office
In May 2019, Rose blocked a vote during a pro forma session of Congress on a $19.1-billion relief bill intended to deliver aid to areas of the U.S. affected by natural disasters the previous year. He cited the national deficit and the vote being held during a Congressional break as reasons for his objection.

In December 2020, Rose was one of 126 Republican members of the House of Representatives to sign an amicus brief in support of Texas v. Pennsylvania, a lawsuit filed at the United States Supreme Court contesting the results of the 2020 presidential election, in which Joe Biden defeated incumbent Donald Trump. In January 2021, Rose was one of 147 Republicans in Congress and 139 in the House to vote to object to the certification of the results of the election.

In June 2021, Rose was one of 21 House Republicans to vote against a resolution to give the Congressional Gold Medal to the United States Capitol Police officers who were on duty during the 2021 United States Capitol attack. He said it was too soon to award the medals and there was not yet enough information about the events on January 6.

In 2022, Rose was one of 39 Republicans to vote for the Merger Filing Fee Modernization Act of 2021, an antitrust package that would crack down on corporations for anti-competitive behavior.

Committee assignments

Committee on Financial Services
Subcommittee on National Security, International Development and Monetary Policy
Subcommittee on Oversight and Investigations
Subcommittee on Housing, Community Development and Insurance
Subcommittee on Financial Institutions and Monetary Policy

Caucus memberships 

 Republican Study Committee

Electoral history

Nonprofit work 
Rose has chaired the Tennessee State Fair Association since its founding in 2010. He has also served on Tennessee Tech University Foundation's board of directors and as chair of the Tennessee Future Farmers of America Foundation.

Rose established the Jerry and Betty Williams Rose Scholarship for agricultural students at Tennessee Tech in memory of his parents.

Personal life
Rose and his wife Chelsea married in January 2011. They live in Cookeville, Tennessee, with their two sons.

References

External links
Congressman John Rose official U.S. House website
John Rose for Congress

|-

|-

1965 births
Living people
People from Cookeville, Tennessee
Purdue University College of Agriculture alumni
Republican Party members of the United States House of Representatives from Tennessee
Tennessee Commissioners of Agriculture
Tennessee Technological University alumni
Vanderbilt University Law School alumni
21st-century American politicians